Fifi and Jules was an Australian drive radio show with Fifi Box and Jules Lund and anchor Byron Cooke. It was broadcast across the Today Network from 4–6 pm weekdays.

History
The show commenced in February 2011 after Hamish Blake and Andy Lee announced in August 2010, that they would be cutting down to a weekly show in 2011. Fifi Box and Jules Lund were announced as hosts of drive from Monday to Thursday. 

In February 2013, Hamish & Andy moved to 4 pm Mondays, with Fifi and Jules presenting Tuesday to Friday. 

In July 2013, Hamish & Andy moved to 3–4 pm each afternoon followed by drive with Fifi and Jules at 4–6 pm from Monday to Friday. 

In November 2013, Fifi Box announced that she would be moving to host breakfast on Fox FM. 

Sophie Monk replaced Fifi Box whilst she was on maternity leave.

In December 2013, it was announced that Fifi and Jules would be replaced by Dan and Maz in Drive as Box moves to Melbourne to host breakfast with Dave Thornton, and Lund joins Sophie Monk, Merrick Watts and Mel B on 2DayFM breakfast in Sydney.

Team
Fifi and Jules team was made up of:
 Fifi Box
 Jules Lund
 Byron Cooke
 Sam Cavanagh - Producer
 Kerri Jones - Producer
 Leon Sjogren - Producer
 Grumpy Dave (Dave Cameron) - Content Director
 Josh Janssen aka Web Guy Josh- Digital Content Producer
 Chris Marsh - Audio Producer
 Danny O'Gready - Assistant Audio Producer

References

Fifi and Jules